The Kandi K27 is an all-electric city car produced by the Chinese manufacturer Kandi Technologies.

History 
In August 2018, Kandi began selling a new, small model of electric car in the form of a five-door hatchback. The K27's overall design is copied from the Daihatsu Cast kei car.

Sale
The Kandi K27 is the first vehicle in the company's history to be sold in the United States along with the larger K23 outside the Chinese market. As a result federal tax breaks, at $12,299 for the cheapest copy, the K27 is the cheapest new electric car to buy in the country.

Technical data
The K27 drive system is made of a 17.69 kWh battery, which ensures a maximum range on a single charge of up to 160 kilometers (100 miles) and a top speed of 101 km/h.

Rebadged variants

Lingbao Box
The Lingbao Box is a rebadged variant of the K27 sold under the Lingbao brand, which forms part of Jiangsu Jemmell New Energy Vehicle Industry company (吉麦新能源汽车) or simply Jemmell. The particular model is also called the Jemmell C01.

The Box is powered by a single electric motor delivering 61 hp and 110 lb-ft (150 Nm) of torque powering the front wheels. A compact 18 kWh battery pack capable of 93 miles (150 km) of range is connected to the motor.

SiTECH AEVS
The SiTECH AEVS is SiTech's third product and is also based on the K27.

See also 
All-electric city cars
 Fiat New 500
 ORA Black Cat
 Smart EQ
 VW e-up!

References 

2020s cars
Cars introduced in 2018
Electric city cars
Front-wheel-drive vehicles
K27
Production electric cars